Melica torreyana is a species of grass known by the common name Torrey's melicgrass.

Distribution
It is endemic to California, where it grows in chaparral, grassland, and other hillside and mountain habitats in the northern and central sections of the state.

Description
Melica torreyana is a perennial bunchgrass with dense clumps of stems up to a meter-3 feet long. The inflorescence is a narrow panicle of small spikelets each under a centimeter long.

External links
Jepson Manual Treatment - Melica torreyana
Grass Manual Treatment
Melica torreyana - Photo Gallery

torreyana
Bunchgrasses of North America
Endemic flora of California
Native grasses of California
Flora of the Klamath Mountains
Flora of the Sierra Nevada (United States)
Natural history of the California chaparral and woodlands
Natural history of the California Coast Ranges
Natural history of the San Francisco Bay Area
Flora without expected TNC conservation status